Alan William Jarman (22 July 1923 – 14 November 1992) was an Australian politician. Born in Melbourne, he attended Wesley College and then the University of Melbourne before becoming an accountant. He served in the military 1942–46. In 1966, he was elected to the Australian House of Representatives as the Liberal member for Deakin. He held the seat until 1983, when he was defeated by John Saunderson of the Labor Party. Jarman died in 1992.

References

Liberal Party of Australia members of the Parliament of Australia
Members of the Australian House of Representatives for Deakin
Members of the Australian House of Representatives
1923 births
1992 deaths
20th-century Australian politicians
People educated at Wesley College (Victoria)
University of Melbourne alumni politicians
Politicians from Melbourne